Stackhousia umbellata is a species of plant in the family Celastraceae.

It blooms between May and August producing yellow flowers.

The species is found in a small area along the coast around Ningaloo in the Gascoyne region of Western Australia where it grows in sandy soils over limestone.

References

umbellata
Plants described in 1963